Trevor Ekdahl (April 3, 1942 - September 7, 2005) was a former professional Canadian football player who played eight seasons with the Canadian Football League's British Columbia Lions.

External links
Career stats

1942 births
2005 deaths
Canadian football offensive linemen
BC Lions players
Montreal Alouettes players
Utah State Aggies football players
Players of Canadian football from Saskatchewan